The 2008–09 Australian Athletics Championships was the 87th edition of the national championship in outdoor track and field for Australia. It was held from 19–21 March 2009 at the Queensland Sport and Athletics Centre in Brisbane. It served as a selection meeting for Australia at the 2009 World Championships in Athletics.

Some long-distance events were staged separately. The 10,000 metres event took place at the Zatopek 10K on 11 December 2008 at Lakeside Stadium in Melbourne, the men's 5000 metres was contested at the Melbourne Track Classic on 5 March 2009 at the Olympic Park Stadium in Melbourne and the women's 5000 metres was held at the Sydney Track Classic on 28 February 2009 at the Sydney Olympic Park Athletic Centre in Sydney.

Medal summary

Men

Women

References

External links 
 Athletics Australia website

2009
Australian Athletics Championships
Australian Championships
Athletics Championships
Sports competitions in Brisbane
2000s in Brisbane